Yang Junxia (born 2 May 1989) is a Chinese judoka who competes in the 63 kg division. She won a silver medal at the 2014 Asian Games and was eliminated in the repechage at the 2016 Olympics. She also competed in the women's 63 kg event at the 2020 Summer Olympics held in Tokyo, Japan.

References

External links

 
 

1989 births
Living people
People from Binzhou
People from Shandong
Sportspeople from Shandong
Chinese female judoka
Olympic judoka of China
Judoka at the 2016 Summer Olympics
Asian Games medalists in judo
Judoka at the 2014 Asian Games
Asian Games silver medalists for China
Asian Games bronze medalists for China
Medalists at the 2014 Asian Games
Judoka at the 2020 Summer Olympics
21st-century Chinese women